Giuseppe Bennati (4 January 1921 – 26 September 2006) was an Italian film director and writer.

He directed Il microfono è vostro (1952), Musoduro (1954), L'amico del giaguaro (1958), Labbra rosse (1960), Congo vivo (1961) and L'assassino ha riservato nove poltrone (1974), his last movie. For RAI in 1970 he directed TV-movie BattleToads (Italo Calvino's bestseller) with Nanni Loy.

He died in Milan, Italy, aged 85 from undisclosed causes.

Selected filmography
Il microfono è vostro (1952)
Musoduro (1953)
 The Friend of the Jaguar (1959)
Labbra rosse (1960)
Congo vivo (1961)
L'assassino ha riservato nove poltrone (1974)

External links 
 

1921 births
2006 deaths
Italian film directors
People from Pitigliano